Neodillonia is a genus of longhorn beetles of the subfamily Lamiinae, containing the following species:

 Neodillonia albisparsa (Germar, 1824)
 Neodillonia waltersi Nearns & Swift, 2011

References

Onciderini